"Tacky" is a song by American musician "Weird Al" Yankovic from his fourteenth studio album, Mandatory Fun (2014). The song is a parody of the 2013 single "Happy" by Pharrell Williams. The song mocks questionable style in fashion as well as activities considered gauche. Yankovic recorded the song as one of the last on Mandatory Fun, and received Williams' approval directly, through email. He remarked he was "honored" to have his work spoofed by Yankovic.

The song's one-shot music video parodies "Happy", and was the first in a series of eight videos released over eight days in promotion of Mandatory Fun. It features cameo appearances by Aisha Tyler, Margaret Cho, Eric Stonestreet, Kristen Schaal, and Jack Black, and was produced by Nerdist Industries.

Background

As usual for him, Yankovic sought permission from the original artists for his parodies on Mandatory Fun; in contrast to previous albums, he had few difficulties in obtaining these. Yankovic stated "This is the first time where I've gotten everybody that I wanted, and I couldn't be happier about it." He was able to get Pharrell Williams' permission for three of the songs he represented on the album, Williams' "Happy", Robin Thicke's "Blurred Lines", and Daft Punk's "Get Lucky", through a personal email to the artist after Yankovic's manager had difficulty working this with Williams' manager; according to Yankovic, Williams was "honored" to have his work used by Yankovic. The song was recorded in April 2014.

Composition
The song mocks people whose actions and style are generally considered gauche. The singer boasts of having no shame and seems proud of his gaudy attire and his breaches of deportment (for example, putting used liquor bottles on display, wearing socks with sandals, mixing patterns, and gorging an entire bowl of after-dinner mints at a restaurant). Reviews noted that the song lists various disruptive acts associated with social media, referencing Instagram, Twitter, and Yelp. Yankovic mentions printing his résumé in Comic Sans, a much-reviled font, and states that he would live-tweet during a funeral and take selfies with the deceased.

Music video
The music video for "Tacky" debuted on July 14, 2014, as the first in an eight-video series. Produced by Nerdist Industries, the one-shot video shows Yankovic mimicking Williams' own style used in his video for "Happy": It features comedians Aisha Tyler, Margaret Cho, Eric Stonestreet, Kristen Schaal, and Jack Black dressed in tacky clothes and purposely dancing badly while lip-syncing to the song's lyrics about a person who brags on about his questionable style choices. The video was filmed at Palace Theatre in downtown Los Angeles, previously featured as Julianne Moore’s apartment in the 1998 film The Big Lebowski. Yankovic specified that during each of the six continuous takes, he would have to rush down five flights of stairs while changing his outfit in order to appear in the beginning and end of the video.

Reception
Rolling Stone reviewed the song "Tacky", stating that "Weird Al is in fine form throughout the track". In their review of Mandatory Fun, the publication wrote: "Sure, there’s a touch of hypocrisy in a guy as gloriously tacky as Al taking shots at the shameless but who really cares when it's this much fun." ABC News wrote that "the parody and musicianship are spot-on, aided by an instantly classic music video". Billboard noted that the song had the potential of being a "one-joke affair", but exceeded these expectations.

Weekly chart positions

See also
List of songs by "Weird Al" Yankovic

Notes

External links
 ""Weird Al" Yankovic - Tacky" music video on YouTube

2014 songs
Music videos directed by "Weird Al" Yankovic
Songs written by Pharrell Williams
Songs with lyrics by "Weird Al" Yankovic
"Weird Al" Yankovic songs